Raney Aronson-Rath produces Frontline, PBS's flagship investigative journalism series. She has been internationally recognized for her work to expand the PBS series' original investigative journalism and directs the editorial development and execution of the series. Aronson-Rath joined Frontline in 2007 as a senior producer. She was named deputy executive producer by David Fanning, the series’ founder, in 2012, and then became executive producer in 2015.

Education 
Aronson-Rath earned a bachelor's degree in South Asian studies and history from the University of Wisconsin. She received her master's from the Columbia University Graduate School of Journalism.

Career 
Early in her professional life, Aronson-Rath worked in Taipei, Taiwan, for a small, English-language daily newspaper, The China Post, where she decided to commit to a career in journalism. Later, Aronson-Rath developed and managed more than a dozen journalistic partnerships with news outlets, including ProPublica, Marketplace, PBS NewsHour, The New York Times, CBC Television, and Univision. 

Moving to TV news production, Aronson-Rath worked on award-winning series at ABC News, The Wall Street Journal, and MSNBC. She also produced, directed, and wrote several award-winning Frontline films, including News War, The Last Abortion Clinic, and The Jesus Factor. 

Aronson-Rath officially joined Frontline in 2007. In 2012, she was named Deputy Editor of Frontline by David Fanning, and Executive Producer in 2015, the position she holds today. She has earned new funding to expand Frontline’s investigative capacity, including the launch of a YouTube channel with original content, a commitment to interactive projects, as well as a film initiative focused on accountability for institutions and public officials called the Transparency Project.

Aronson-Rath currently serves on the Knight Commission on Trust, Media, and Democracy, the Board of Visitors for Columbia University’s Journalism school, and the Advisory Board of Columbia Global Reports.

Awards and honors 

Aronson-Rath was a 2014-2015 Fellow at the MIT Open Doc Lab. Aronson-Rath has been a speaker at the Skoll World Forum, the Aspens Ideas Summit, The National Scholastic Press Association's High School Journalism Convention, the Columbia University Graduate School of Journalism, and The Power of Narrative Journalism Conference.

Since 2015, Frontline has won many accolades under her direction, including The Alfred I. duPont–Columbia University Award, IRE Awards, The George Foster Peabody Award, Peabody-Facebook Futures of Media Award, the National Academy of Television Arts and Sciences Emmy Award, the Robert F. Kennedy Journalism Award, the Overseas Press Club Awards, The Scripps Howard Award, and Writer’s Guild Awards, and the 2019 dupont-Columbia Gold Baton award, among others.

References

Living people
American television producers
PBS people
20th-century births
Columbia University Graduate School of Journalism alumni
 University of Wisconsin–Madison College of Letters and Science alumni
Year of birth missing (living people)